Yuri is a 2019 English language romantic horror film, written and directed by Arga Thura starring Aung Myo Win, Wendy Myat Htet Tun, Einnadi Naing, Han Min Htet Kyaw, Ngwe Zin Oo and May Myat Noe. The film was premiered in Myanmar on December 12, 2019. The sound track of the film released on March 9, 2020.

Synopsis
Yuri is one of the films that responds to young love in a different way from the audience.  This film depicts the hardships and love times of the students.

Cast
Aung Myo Win as Hank
Wendy Myat Htet Tun as Yuri
Einnadi Naing as Evelyn
Han Min Htet Kyaw as Andrew
May Myat Noe as Jennifer
Ngwe Zin Oo

References

External links

2019 films
2010s English-language films
Burmese horror films
Films shot in Myanmar